Steven Paul Burton (born 9 October 1983) is an English footballer.

Burtons former teams include Boston United, Doncaster Rovers, Scarborough, Crawley Town and Harrogate Town.

On 28 June 2007, local newspaper Tamworth Herald confirmed that Tamworth manager Gary Mills had said that Burton hadn't been offered a new deal at the club and was unlikely to receive one along with fellow striker Jon Stevenson.

It was confirmed on 2 July 2007 that Burton had teamed up with his former manager Mark Cooper, who he played under at Tamworth, by signing a one-year deal with Kettering Town.

He has however been allowed to leave the club and was given a trial with Cambridge United.

On 11 December 2007, Burton left Kettering Town to join Harrogate Town. Steve made his Harrogate Town debut on 22 December 2008 against Worcester City however Harrogate Town lost 1–0. Steve scored his first goal for Harrogate Town in the 2–2 draw against Hyde United on 29 December 2007 in the last minute of the game. Throughout the remainder of the season Steve suffered from an abdominal injury that limited his starting chances. At the end of the season, Steve found himself on the released list at Harrogate Town and joined Guiseley AFC. In September 2010 he signed for Bradford Park Avenue.

In February 2011 Burton signed for Football West Premier League side Balcatta SC – he made his debut for the club on 20 March scoring a hat-trick in their 5–1 win at Bayswater City.

In July 2012 he joined South Melbourne FC.

In January 2013 he joined Football West Premier League side Bayswater City Soccer Club.

References

External links

1983 births
Living people
Footballers from Doncaster
English footballers
Association football forwards
Ipswich Town F.C. players
Boston United F.C. players
Doncaster Rovers F.C. players
Scarborough F.C. players
Leigh Genesis F.C. players
Canvey Island F.C. players
Crawley Town F.C. players
Tamworth F.C. players
Kettering Town F.C. players
Harrogate Town A.F.C. players
Guiseley A.F.C. players
Bradford (Park Avenue) A.F.C. players
South Melbourne FC players
Floreat Athena FC players
National League (English football) players
Expatriate soccer players in Australia
Inglewood United FC players
Bayswater City SC players